The Southeastern Conference is an American college athletic conference whose member institutions are located primarily in the Southern part of the United States.

Southeastern or Southeast Conference may also refer to:
Southeast Conference (Iowa),  American high school athletic conference in Iowa
Southeast Conference (Wisconsin), American high school athletic conference in Wisconsin
Southeast Conference, United Church of Christ, American regional body of the United Church of Christ
Southeastern Conference (MHSAA), American high school athletic conference in Michigan